Dudi Sela was the defending champion but decided not to participate.
Yuki Bhambri won the title defeating Amir Weintraub in the final 6–3, 6–3.

Seeds

Draw

Finals

Top half

Bottom half

References
 Main draw
 Qualifying draw

2012 ATP Challenger Tour
2012 Singles